The MPL16 is an automated rubber-tyred metro train designed by Alstom for the Lyon Metro.

References

Lyon Metro rolling stock
Electric multiple units of France
750 V DC multiple units
Alstom multiple units